Vivien Inez Saunders,  (born 24 November 1946) is a retired English professional golfer, known after winning the Women's British Open in 1977. She had a successful amateur career, appearing in the 1968 Curtis Cup. She has published a number of golf books and instructional videos.

Early years 
Saunders was born in Sutton, Surrey on 24 November 1946 and educated at Nonsuch County High School, Cheam, Surrey.

Golf career 
Saunders was runner-up to Liz Chadwick in the 1966 British Ladies Amateur Golf Championship, losing 3 & 2 in the final.

Saunders turned professional in early 1969 and became the first European to qualify for the LPGA Tour later in 1969.

Amateur wins 
1967 Avia Foursomes (with Bridget Jackson)

Professional wins 
1977 Women's British Open
1978 Avia Foursomes (with Mary Everard)
1980 British Car Auctions Tournament (tied with Bridget Cooper)
Keighley Trophy
four tournaments in Australia

Other achievements 
She was editor of Lady Golfer for several years, also the founder of the Women's Professional Golf Association and the European Women's Tour. Made honorary life member of PGA and Women's European Tour but had to resign from each to regain amateur status and play. Previously on Executive Committee of PGA, Chairman Women's PGA. Among council member of National Coaching Foundation 1993 to 1997. She has twice won the British Sports Coach of the Year Award.

In 1986, she bought Abbotsley Golf Club, near St Neots, Cambridgeshire. She is the chairman of the Association of Golf Course Owners.

Saunders was appointed Officer of the Order of the British Empire (OBE) for services to women's golf in the 1998 New Year Honours.

In the 2015 general election, she ran against Prime Minister David Cameron in Witney for the Reduce VAT in Sport party, which she also led.

Team appearances
Amateur
Curtis Cup (representing Great Britain & Ireland): 1968
European Ladies' Team Championship (representing England): 1967 (winners)
Commonwealth Trophy (representing Great Britain): 1967 (winners)
Vagliano Trophy (representing Great Britain & Ireland): 1967

References

External links
Personal web site
Penguin Books profile

English female golfers
Officers of the Order of the British Empire
People from Sutton, London
People educated at Nonsuch High School
Leaders of political parties in the United Kingdom
1946 births
Living people